Physokentia dennisii is a species of palm tree in the family Arecaceae. It is found only in Solomon Islands. It is threatened by habitat loss.

Physokentia dennisii is named after Geoffrey F.C. Dennis (1918-1995), an Australian born botanist and resident of the Solomon Islands since 1946. This palm is a handsome species with a solitary slender bright green, ringed trunk supported by numerous slender stilt roots to a height of about 2 metres above ground in mature specimens. It has a light green crownshaft bearing long arching leaves with numerous pointed leaflets. The inflorescence is ivory-colored, and globular fruits ripen black. It can grow to over 10 metres and it is an understorey palm, even at maturity.

References

dennisii
Endemic flora of the Solomon Islands
Trees of the Solomon Islands
Data deficient plants
Taxonomy articles created by Polbot